The 2016 Sport11 Ladies Open was a professional tennis tournament played on outdoor clay courts. It was the 1st edition of the tournament and part of the 2016 ITF Women's Circuit, offering a total of $50,000 in prize money. It took place in Budapest, Hungary, on 5–11 September 2016.

Singles main draw entrants

Seeds 

 1 Rankings as of 29 August 2016.

Other entrants 
The following player received a wildcard into the singles main draw:
  Vanda Lukács
  Luca Nagymihály
  Elena Gabriela Ruse
  Patty Schnyder

The following players received entry from the qualifying draw:
  Ágnes Bukta
  Magdalena Fręch
  Michaela Hončová
  Gabriela Pantůčková

Champions

Singles

 Irina Khromacheva def.  Cindy Burger, 6–1, 6–2

Doubles

 Cindy Burger /  Arantxa Rus def.  Ágnes Bukta /  Jesika Malečková, 6–1, 6–4

External links 
 2016 Sport11 Ladies Open at ITFtennis.com
 Official website 

2016 ITF Women's Circuit
2016 in Hungarian women's sport
 
2016 in Hungarian tennis